The Glens Falls Stakes is a Grade II American Thoroughbred horse race for fillies and mares aged four years old and older held over a distance of one and a half miles on the turf held annually in August at Saratoga Race Course in Saratoga Springs, New York.  The event currently carries a purse of $250,000.

History

The event at Saratoga Race Course is named after the nearby city of Glens Falls, New York.

The inaugural running of the event was on 9 August 1996 over a distance of  miles for fillies and mares
three-years-old and older and was won by the 17-1 longshot Ampulla who was ridden by Shane Sellers in a time of 2:16.49 by a two lengths margin.

From 1998 to 2010 the event was run under handicap conditions.

In 1999 the event was upgraded in classification by the Thoroughbred Owners and Breeders Association's American Graded Stakes Committee to Grade III.

The Glens Falls Handicap was run in two divisions in 2004.

The event has been taken off the turf due the state of the turf track three times and run at a shorter distance: 2000, 2001, 2013.

In 2018 the event was upgrade to Grade II.

In 2020 the conditions of the event were modified for entrance to fillies and mares aged four years old and older.

In 2021 the distance of the event was increased from  miles to  miles.

Records
Speed  record:
 miles: 2:27.55  – War Like Goddess (2021)
 miles: 2:11.46  – White Rose (2015)

Margins:
7 lengths – Auntie Mame  (1998)

Most wins:
 2 – War Like Goddess (2021, 2022)

Most wins by an owner:
 2 – George Krikorian (2021, 2022)

Most wins by a jockey:
 5 – John R. Velazquez (1998, 2004, 2005, 2014, 2015)

Most wins by a trainer:
 7 – William I. Mott (1999, 2009, 2015, 2016, 2017, 2021, 2022)

Winners

Legend:

See also
 List of American and Canadian Graded races

References

Graded stakes races in the United States
Grade 3 stakes races in the United States
Long-distance horse races for fillies and mares
Horse races in New York (state)
Turf races in the United States
Saratoga Race Course
1996 establishments in New York (state)
Recurring sporting events established in 1996